Keith Briggs (born 11 December 1981) is an English football coach and former professional player.

Career
Born in Glossop, Derbyshire, Briggs began his career as a trainee Stockport County in August 1999 and made his debut in a League Cup 1st round tie against Oldham in the same month. He made 68 league and cup appearances for Stockport before joining Norwich City in January 2003 for £65,000, where he was unable to establish a regular place in the first team and spent a loan spell at Crewe Alexandra. He made three league appearances during Norwich's 2003–04 season after which they were promoted to the Premier League as First Division champions. Briggs was released by Norwich in September 2004 and returned to Stockport in January 2005. After making a further 98 appearances for Stockport County, his contract was not renewed and he joined Shrewsbury Town on non-contract terms in January 2008. He scored on his debut against Hereford United but was released by manager Gary Peters after playing just two games and joined Mansfield Town on loan in February 2008. He left Mansfield at the end of the 2007–08 season, and played for Stalybridge Celtic during the 2008–09 season. In 2011, he signed a two-year deal with Fleetwood Town for a fee believed to be in the region of £8,000. Upon his release he re-signed with Kidderminster Harriers in 2012. At the end of the 2012–13 season Briggs signed a contract with Halifax Town. He went out on loan to Barrow before being appointed manager of Stalybridge Celtic on 18 October 2013. On 15 March, Briggs resigned as the manager of Stalybridge Celtic. He later managed New Mills A.F.C. in the Northern Premier League Division One North.

References

External links

Career information at ex-canaries.co.uk

Living people
1981 births
People from Glossop
Footballers from Derbyshire
Association football midfielders
English footballers
English Football League players
Stockport County F.C. players
Norwich City F.C. players
Crewe Alexandra F.C. players
Shrewsbury Town F.C. players
Mansfield Town F.C. players
Stalybridge Celtic F.C. players
Kidderminster Harriers F.C. players
Fleetwood Town F.C. players
FC Halifax Town players
Barrow A.F.C. players
National League (English football) players
English football managers
Stalybridge Celtic F.C. managers
New Mills A.F.C. managers
National League (English football) managers